Wilson Sánchez Ibarra (born May 25, 1978 in Colombia) is a retired Colombian-Salvadoran footballer.

He played for several clubs in El Salvador, including Platense, Santa Tecla F.C., Vista Hermosa and Atlético Marte.

References

1978 births
Living people
Colombian footballers
Naturalized citizens of El Salvador
Salvadoran people of Colombian descent
A.D. Isidro Metapán footballers
C.D. Atlético Marte footballers
C.D. Vista Hermosa footballers
Santa Tecla F.C. footballers
Colombian expatriate footballers
Expatriate footballers in El Salvador
Expatriate footballers in Guatemala
Association football defenders